Somedaydream is a Filipino synthpop project created by singer/songwriter and music producer Rez Toledo in 2011 in Manila, Philippines.

Biography

2011–present: Somedaydream
In February 2011, Somedaydream gained mainstream popularity with his first single "Hey Daydreamer", which quickly topped the charts of local radio stations within the Greater Manila Area. His follow-up singles achieved similar success.

Somedaydream's group of fans call themselves "Dreamers" and his official fan club is called "Dreamers Official". The single "Hey Daydreamer" was used in a Selecta Cornetto commercial.

On 29 November 2011, Somedaydream's self-titled debut album Somedaydream was released.

In March 2012, Somedaydream collaborated with Sarah Geronimo and Gary Valenciano for "Tuloy", a song now used as Coca-Cola's 100th Anniversary theme song in the Philippines. Also as part of the anniversary, Somedaydream, along with other artists, performed at the Coca-Cola Concert Ng Bayan, held on 23 March 2012 at the SM Mall of Asia Concert Grounds. Somedaydream performed "Tuloy" live during the concert with collaborators Sarah Geronimo and Gary Valenciano.

Following the success of his debut album, Toledo co-founded 2 independent brands: Futurestudio, a record label, and Logiclub, an artist/producer collective management outfit. He later began collaborating with former General Luna vocalist Nicole Asensio on their collaborative album, in partnership with MCA Music and D5 Studio Originals.

Discography

Albums
Somedaydream (2011)
Holographic: Green Year (2017)

Awards & nominations

References

Filipino pop musicians
Synth-pop singers
Filipino rock singers
MCA Music Inc. (Philippines) artists